Plexin-B3 is a protein that in humans is encoded by the PLXNB3 gene.

Interactions 

PLXNB3 has been shown to interact with ARHGEF11.

Model organisms 

Model organisms have been used in the study of PLXNB3 function. A conditional knockout mouse line called Plxnb3tm1a(KOMP)Wtsi was generated at the Wellcome Trust Sanger Institute. Male and female animals underwent a standardized phenotypic screen to determine the effects of deletion. Additional screens performed:  - In-depth immunological phenotyping

References

Further reading